Fritz Ullmann (July 2, 1875 in Fürth – March 17, 1939 in Berlin) was a German chemist.

Ullmann was born in Fürth and started studying chemistry in Nuremberg, but received his PhD of the University of Geneva for work with Carl Gräbe in 1895. After some time in Geneva he went to Berlin in 1905.
Ullmann taught technical chemistry during 1905-1913 and 1922-1925 at the Technischen Hochschule Berlin now Technische Universität Berlin, first as part of the ordinary teaching staff, later on as a professor. 
In 1900 he introduced dimethyl sulfate as an alkylating agent. Between 1914 and 1922, when he was back in Geneva, he published the first edition of the "Enzyklopädie der Technischen Chemie" in 12 volumes in English the Ullmann's Encyclopedia of Industrial Chemistry, a publication that exists to this day. He was married to Irma Goldberg who was his assistant from 1905 to 1910 at his laboratory.

They named after themselves the following reactions: the Ullmann reaction, the Ullmann condensation, the Graebe-Ullmann synthesis, the Goldberg reaction and the illustrious Jordan-Ullmann-Goldberg synthesis.

References 
 

20th-century German chemists
Academic staff of the Technical University of Berlin
University of Geneva alumni
People from Fürth
1875 births
1939 deaths